Gyponyx is a large genus of nocturnal, Afrotropical checkered beetles, with a fairly constant colour pattern on the elytra. They may be carnivorous as adults and as larvae, but are poorly studied.

References

External links

Cleridae genera